Grenada High School is a public high school located in Grenada, Mississippi, United States. It educates students in grades 9 through 12 and is the only high school in the Grenada School District.

History
The first public high school in Grenada was founded in the fall of 1885.

In May 1962, alumnus Erle Johnston gave the commencement speech titled "The Practical Way to Maintain a Separate School System in Mississippi" in which he criticized the "extremism" of the NAACP and Citizens Councils. After strong resistance, vicious attacks, and intimidation, the school was integrated in 1966.

In 2021 the school had a roughly equal number of African American and white students. 100 percent of the school's students were categorized as economically disadvantaged.

Athletics
Grenada's athletic teams are the Chargers and compete in Mississippi High School Athletics Association 5A Region 1.

Performing arts
The Grenada marching band program won 39 championships in the last decades of the 1900s; it also made appearances in the Macy's Thanksgiving Day Parade in 1995 and 2001 and the Tournament of Roses Parade in 1998. The band won the 1997 National High School Band of the Year award.

GHS also has a competitive show choir, "Visions".

Other activities
The school has an ROTC chapter.

Notable alumni
Genard Avery, football player
Tyre Phillips, football player
Greg Robinson, football player
Trumaine Sykes, football player
Charlie Worsham, musician

References

High schools in Mississippi
1885 establishments in Mississippi
Educational institutions established in 1885
Education in Grenada County, Mississippi